Merwe Gerhard Erasmus (born 11 April 1995) is a Namibian cricketer, and the current captain of the Namibia cricket team.

Career
Erasmus first played at senior level for Namibia in February 2011, aged 15, against a touring Marylebone Cricket Club (MCC) side. He made his international and first-class debut for Namibia against Ireland in September 2011 in the 2011–2013 ICC Intercontinental Cup, and at the age of 16, became the youngest player in the team's history. He was named in Namibia's squad for the 2012 ICC World Twenty20 Qualifier.

Erasmus was named in the Namibia under-19s squad for the 2012 Under-19 Cricket World Cup in Australia. He captained the team at the 2014 Under-19 Cricket World Cup in the United Arab Emirates.

In January 2018, Erasmus was named in Namibia's squad for the 2018 ICC World Cricket League Division Two tournament. In August 2018, he was named in Namibia's squad for the 2018 Africa T20 Cup.

In March 2019, Erasmus was named as the captain of Namibia's squad for the 2019 ICC World Cricket League Division Two tournament. Namibia finished in the top four places in the tournament, therefore gaining One Day International (ODI) status. Erasmus made his ODI debut for Namibia on 27 April 2019, against Oman, in the tournament's final. In May 2019, he was named as the captain of Namibia's squad for the Regional Finals of the 2018–19 ICC T20 World Cup Africa Qualifier tournament in Uganda. He made his Twenty20 International (T20I) debut for Namibia against Ghana on 20 May 2019.

In June 2019, Erasmus was one of twenty-five cricketers to be named in Cricket Namibia's Elite Men's Squad ahead of the 2019–20 international season. In September 2019, he was named as the captain of Namibia's squad for the 2019 ICC T20 World Cup Qualifier tournament in the United Arab Emirates. He was the leading run-scorer for Namibia in the tournament, with 268 runs in nine matches. Following the conclusion of the final, he was named as the player of the tournament.

In September 2021, Erasmus was named as the captain of Namibia's squad for the 2021 ICC Men's T20 World Cup, with the International Cricket Council (ICC) later naming him as the key player in Namibia's team. In a warm-up match against Scotland before the tournament, he broke a finger while fielding. However, he decided to continue playing in the tournament and captain his team in spite of the injury.

In March 2022, in the second match of the 2022 United Arab Emirates Tri-Nation Series, Erasmus scored his first century in ODI cricket, with 121 not out. The following month, in the second match against Uganda, Erasmus also scored his first century in T20I cricket, with an unbeaten 100 against Uganda.

In January 2023, Erasmus won the International Cricket Council's Associate Cricketer of the Year award. Erasmus scored 956 ODI runs at an average of 56.23 and took a dozen wickets in 2022, and scored a century in both ODI and T20I formats.

Personal life
As of 2018, Erasmus was a fourth-year law student at the University of Stellenbosch in South Africa. His father Francois runs a family law firm in Windhoek and is a former president of Cricket Namibia and associate director of the International Cricket Council (ICC).

References

External links
 

1995 births
Living people
Cricketers from Windhoek
Namibian cricketers
Namibia One Day International cricketers
Namibia Twenty20 International cricketers